Alix is a village in central Alberta, Canada that is northeast of Red Deer. Its village mascot is the Alix-Gator, who is featured prominently on many signs and businesses.

Originally, the settlement was called Toddsville after Joseph Todd. When the settlement was incorporated on June 3, 1907, it was named after Alexia Westhead, the first white woman settler of the community. (Alix was her nickname.) The first mayor of Alix was Robert F. Sanderson, who also owned and ran the general store.

Alix became the home to Dr. Irene Parlby, one of the "Famous Five." Irene Parlby's public life may be said to have begun in 1913 when she was chosen as secretary of the Alix Country Women's Club. Her public role greatly expanded when she was elected President of the United Farmers of Alberta's (UFA) Women's Auxiliary, and reached its greatest point when she was made Minister without Portfolio when the UFA formed the government of Alberta in 1921, a position she held for 14 years.

Demographics

See also 
List of communities in Alberta
List of villages in Alberta

References

External links 

1907 establishments in Alberta
Villages in Alberta